Marius Radu (born 1 June 1977 in Iernut) is a Romanian former footballer.

References

External links

Profile at Sohu Sports 

1977 births
Living people
Romanian footballers
FC Argeș Pitești players
FC Sopron players
Tianjin Jinmen Tiger F.C. players
CS Gaz Metan Mediaș players
Association football defenders
Expatriate footballers in Hungary
Expatriate footballers in China
Liga I players
Association football forwards